Jonathan Nordbotten (born 14 July 1989) is a Norwegian former alpine ski racer, who specialised in slalom.

He competed at the 2015 World Championships in Beaver Creek, USA, in the slalom., and had been on the World Cup tour and European tour since 2015. He represented Norway at the 2018 Winter Olympics in PyeongChang, South Korea.

Nordbotten skied collegiately for the University of Vermont Catamounts, where he was a five-time NCAA All-American and 2013 NCAA Slalom Champion and part of Vermont's 2012 NCAA National Championship team.

Season standings

Standings through 30 January 2018

References

External links
 
 
 

1989 births
Norwegian male alpine skiers
Living people
Olympic alpine skiers of Norway
Alpine skiers at the 2018 Winter Olympics
University of Vermont alumni
Medalists at the 2018 Winter Olympics
Olympic medalists in alpine skiing
Olympic bronze medalists for Norway
Vermont Catamounts skiers